Henry Waite Plummer (1771-1847) was a planter and slave-owner in Jamaica. He was elected to the House of Assembly of Jamaica in 1820.

References

External links 

Members of the House of Assembly of Jamaica
Planters from the British West Indies
British slave owners
1771 births
1847 deaths